Carlos Barbosa Romero is a Colombian theatre and television actor, born 15 January 1944 in Bogotá.

Mr Barbosa majored in architecture at the Universidad del Valle in Cali, where he joined a theatre group which would become its Scenic Arts Department. Later, he would join the Compañía de Teatro Nacional de Colombia, which started a failed tour which would end in Costa Rica, where he ended up living briefly. Later he moved to San Andrés y Providencia before going back to Bogotá in the early 1970s, to join the Teatro Popular de Bogotá. His television debut would occur in 1975 in anthology series Teatro Popular Caracol and Cuento del domingo. He also has performed in several films.

Among his television roles, Mr Barbosa is best remembered for Eurípides, a homosexual hairdresser, in the 1987 telenovela El divino, and Ernesto in the 1992-1999 sitcom Vuelo secreto. Mr Barbosa also appeared in the 2004 telenovela La Saga, Negocio de Familia and 2009 telenovela Bermúdez (as Gerardo Bermúdez), both for Caracol TV. As of 2010, he plays Tío Abdul in Telemundo 2010 telenovela, El Clon.

References

External links 
Colarte

Male actors from Bogotá
Colombian male television actors
Colombian male telenovela actors
1944 births
Living people
University of Valle people